A half-turn may refer to:

 A point reflection: a rotation of 180 degrees around a point
 A U-turn: a driving maneuver used to reverse direction